

Events
Syndicate hitman Charles "The Bug" Workman, a suspect in the murder of Dutch Schultz, is imprisoned.
February – Emil Nizich, a minor organized crime figure involved in labor racketeering, is shot three times from behind and left in a gutter while on his way to a basketball game in Manhattan. 
February 6 – Benjamin "Benny the Boss" Tannenbaum, an associate of Louis "Lepke" Buchalter and Jacob "Gurrah" Shapiro, is murdered while babysitting at a friends house.
June 12 – Murder Inc. members Harry Strauss and Martin Goldstein are executed by electrocution for the murder of gambler "Puggy" Feinstein.
November 12 – Abe Reles, co-boss of Murder, Inc. turned informant, mysteriously plummets to his death from his guarded hotel room after Albert Anastasia promises a $100,000 reward for his demise.

Births
Leoluca Bagarella "The Brother-In-Law", Sicilian mafioso
John F. Castagna "Sonny", Patriarca crime family associate
Salvatore D'Aquilla "Butch", Patriarca crime family associate
Tino Fiumara, Genovese crime family member
Antonio L. Spagnolo, Patriarca crime family soldier
11 September – Marcello Dell'Utri, Italian politician and mafia associate

Deaths
February – Emil Nizich, New York mobster
February 6 – Benjamin Tannenbaum "Benny the Boss", associate of Louis Buchalter and Jacob Shapiro
June 12 – Martin Goldstein, Murder, Inc. hitman
June 12 – Harry Strauss, Murder, Inc. hitman
November 12 – Abe Reles "Kid Twist", Murder, Inc. hitman and government informant

Organized crime
Years in organized crime